Jensen McRae (born September 10, 1997) is an American singer-songwriter and poet. She gained prominence for her debut singles "White Boy" (2019) and "Wolves"(2020). Her music has been recommended by Rolling Stone, Vulture, Nylon, NPR, and The Fader. Her debut EP Who Hurt You? was released on June 25, 2021, followed by her debut studio album Are You Happy Now?, which was released on March 22, 2022.

Early life and education 
McRae was born in Santa Monica, California and raised in the Woodland Hills neighborhood of Los Angeles. She is of Black and white Jewish descent. She has been singing since childhood and began to study piano at age 7. Her early music influences were Carole King, James Taylor, Stevie Wonder, and Alicia Keys. She attended a summer program, Grammy Camp, during high school, which helped her decide to pursue music as a career path.

McRae received a bachelor’s degree in popular music performance from USC Thornton School of Music on a full-ride scholarship.

Career 
McRae released her first two EPs online during college, Lighter (2017) and Milkshakes (2018). Her debut single "White Boy" was released after her college graduation in 2019, followed by "Wolves" in 2020.

McRae is compared to folk artists like Tracy Chapman and describes her music as "folk-alternative-pop". She is an alto. She said that music industry professionals attempt to box her music into r&b and soul because she's a Black artist. Her music was described by WNUR: "Her rich, soothing voice complements the poised rebellion rooted in her socially and politically conscious lyrics." Her lyrics frequently reference personal experiences and larger social and political themes. In March 2020 she released "The Plague" in reference to the United States government's failure to respond effectively to the COVID-19 pandemic.

In January 2021, McRae tweeted "in 2023 Phoebe Bridgers is gonna drop her third album & the opening track will be about hooking up in the car while waiting in line to get vaccinated at dodger stadium and it’s gonna make me cry." The Tweet went viral, and Bridgers also retweeted it. Soon after she released the parody vaccination theme song "Immune" in the style of Bridgers, produced by Rahki. That month she also collaborated with fellow Black folk artist Joy Oladokun on the track "Wish You the Best".

In March 2021 she released the track "Starting To Get To You," which was named one of NPR's 16 Songs Public Radio Can't Stop Playing.

Her debut extended play Who Hurt You? was released on June 22, 2021. On February 22, 2022 McRae announced her debut studio album Are You Happy Now?. It was released on March 22, 2022 and features all of the songs from Who Are You? except "Immune".

Discography

Studio album

Extended plays

Singles

As lead artist

As featured artist

Accolades 

 2020 - Complex, Best New Artists of the Month (March)
2020 - KCRW, 10 Best Songs of the Year (for "Wolves")
 2021 - NPR, Slingshot's 2021 Artists To Watch
 2021 - #YOUTUBEBLACK Voices Artist, Class of 2021

References

External links 
 Official Instagram
Official YouTube

1997 births
Living people
African-American women singer-songwriters
American indie rock musicians
American folk-pop singers
Jewish American artists
Jewish women writers
Jewish American writers
American women poets
African-American Jews
Singers from Los Angeles
University of Southern California alumni
21st-century African-American women singers
21st-century American Jews
Singer-songwriters from California